Helpringham railway station was a station in Helpringham, Lincolnshire.

The station was opened by the Great Northern and Great Eastern Joint Railway on 6 March 1882.

The station closed for passengers on 4 July 1955.

References

Disused railway stations in Lincolnshire
Former Great Northern and Great Eastern Joint Railway stations
Railway stations in Great Britain opened in 1882
Railway stations in Great Britain closed in 1955